The 2011 Cambodian League season is the 27th season of top-tier football in Cambodia. A total of ten teams are competing in the league. The season started in March.

League table

Top scorers

References 

C-League seasons
Cambodia
Cambodia
1